Andrew Zebulon Cohen (born 1955) is a Canadian journalist, author, and professor of journalism at Carleton University's School of Journalism and Norman Paterson School of International Affairs. Cohen has written widely on international affairs and on Canadian politics. His books include A Deal Undone: The Making and Breaking of the Meech Lake Accord and Trudeau's Shadow: The Life and Legacy of Pierre Elliott Trudeau.

Cohen was born in Montreal, Quebec. He studied political science at McGill University and then took graduate degrees in journalism and international relations at Carleton University. From 1991 to 1993, he was a visiting fellow at the University of Cambridge. He also spent a year at the German Institute for International and Security Affairs in Berlin.

He has worked as a journalist for The Ottawa Citizen, United Press International, Time, The Financial Post, Saturday Night and The Globe and Mail. At the Globe and Mail, he was a member of the Editorial Board and a columnist and foreign correspondent in Washington. Cohen has won two Canadian National Newspaper Awards, three National Magazine Awards and the Queen's Golden Jubilee Medal.

He has written and co-edited six books, among them The Unfinished Canadian: The People We Are, and While Canada Slept: How We Lost Our Place in the World, which was a national bestseller and a finalist for the Governor General's Literary Award for Non-Fiction. His other publications include Extraordinary Canadians: Lester B. Pearson, and Lost Beneath the Ice: The Story of HMS Investigator.

Cohen lives in Ottawa, Ontario, Canada with his wife, Mary and his two children, Rachel and Alexander.

Partial bibliography
 Trudeau's Shadow: The Life and Legacy of Pierre Elliott Trudeau written with J.L. Granatstein (Vintage Canada, 1999)
 While Canada Slept: How We Lost Our Place in the World (2003)
  The Unfinished Canadian: The People We Are (McClelland & Stewart, 2007)
 Extraordinary Canadians: Lester B. Pearson written with John Ralston Saul (Penguin Canada, 2008 )
 Lost Beneath the Ice: The Story of HMS Investigator (Dundurn, 2013)
  Two Days in June: John F. Kennedy and the 48 Hours that Made History (2014)

References

Living people
1955 births
Canadian political journalists
Carleton University alumni
Academic staff of Carleton University
McGill University alumni
Journalists from Montreal
Jewish Canadian journalists